The Galenki RT-70 radio telescope (Russian: Гaленkий РТ-70) is an RT-70 telescope at the East Center for Deep Space Communications, Galenki (Ussuriysk), Russia.

With its 70m antenna diameter, it is among the largest single dish radio telescopes in the world.  It forms part of the Soviet Deep Space Network.

Two other RT-70 telescopes are:
 Yevpatoria RT-70 radio telescope – at the Center for Deep Space Communications, Yevpatoria
 Suffa RT-70 radio telescope – at the Suffa Radio Observatory

External links 
 Russian Space Agency Backs US Asteroid Control Plan (mentions Galenki telescope)

Radio telescopes
Astronomical observatories built in the Soviet Union